Mekmek is a Yuat language of Papua New Guinea.

References

Yuat languages
Languages of East Sepik Province